The following is a list of international organization leaders in 2003.

UN organizations

Political and economic organizations

Financial organizations

Sports organizations

Other organizations

See also
List of state leaders in 2003
List of religious leaders in 2003
List of colonial governors in 2003
List of international organization leaders in 2002
List of international organization leaders in 2004

References

2003
2003 in international relations
Lists of office-holders in 2003